The Civilian Technical Corps was an American quasi-military uniformed organization raised in 1941 in the United States of America, to directly assist with the war effort within the United Kingdom. The Corps was manned by volunteer civilians.

Their support role was primarily in connection with RADAR and radio, but was extended across a wide range of areas over time. They wore a uniform identical to the wartime Royal Air Force, but with unusual wreath-and-bars non-commissioned rank badges instead of chevrons, of the same design as those issued to members of the Royal Observer Corps, another semi-military air force corps within the UK during the same era.

External links

Civilian Technical Corps

1941 establishments in the United Kingdom
Military units and formations established in 1941
Military units and formations disestablished in 1945
Military history of the United Kingdom during World War II
Military of the United Kingdom